Confrontation is the fourth studio album from the Louisiana-based sludge metal band Soilent Green. Confrontation is also the last Soilent Green album to be released under the Relapse Records label.

Track listing

"Scarlet Sunrise" - 1:03
"Leaves of Three" - 3:13
"A Scream Trapped Under Water" - 5:02
"Forgive & Regret" - 2:15
"12 oz. Prophet" - 2:41
"Southern Spirit Suite" - 0:35
"Pretty Smiles & Shattered Teeth" - 4:39
"Liquor & Cigarettes" - 0:46
"Theory of Pride in Tragedy" - 5:03
"Fingernails on a Chalkboard" - 3:27
"Paper Cut" - 0:58
"They Lie to Hide the Truth" - 4:42
"Another Cheap Brand of Luck" - 0:32
"This Glass House of Broken Words" - 2:42
"A Permanent Solution to a Temporary Problem" - 21:56

Personnel
Louis Benjamin Falgoust II - vocals
Brian Patton - lead guitar
Tony White - rhythm guitar
Scott Crochet - bass
Tommy Buckley - drums
Josh Galeos - mixing

References

Soilent Green albums
2005 albums
Albums produced by Erik Rutan
Relapse Records albums